Claus Mogensen (born 18 January 1973) is a Danish handball coach and former handball player, who trains SønderjyskE Håndbold as assistant coach since February 2023 and has won two silver medals with the Norwegian team Byåsen HE.

He has previously also been a coach for SK Aarhus, from 2011 to 2013.

References

External links 
 

1973 births
Living people
Danish male handball players
Danish handball coaches
Danish expatriates in Norway